Cornelia MacIntyre Foley  was an American painter from Hawaii.

Biography

Cornelia MacIntyre was born in Honolulu, Territory of Hawaii on January 31, 1909.  She began her art training under the first art instructor the University of Hawaii, Huc-Mazelet Luquiens (1881–1961). Foley continued her art education at the University of Washington, and spent two years in London at the Slade School of Art as a pupil of Henry Tonks (1862–1937). From London, she returned to Hawaii, where she studied with Madge Tennent from 1934 to 1937 and subsequently married Lieutenant Paul Foley (who became a Rear Admiral in the United States Navy).  During 1937–1941, the couple lived in Long Beach, CA and in Seattle, Washington in 1941–1942. Cornelia Foley died January 18, 2010, in Severna Park, Maryland.

Foley is best known for her voluptuous paintings of Hawaiian women, such as Hawaiian Woman in White Holoku from 1937. Major paintings by Foley are held by the Honolulu Museum of Art and the Nelson-Atkins Museum of Art in Kansas City, Missouri.  A cast concrete outdoor fountain, known as the Varhey Circle Fountain, which she created with Henry H. Rempel, is on the campus of the University of Hawaii at Manoa.

References
 Congdon-Martin, Douglas, Aloha Spirit, Hawaiian Art and Popular Design, Schiffer Publishing, Atglen, PA, 1998, pp. 166–168
 Falk, Peter Hastings, Who was Who in American Art, 1564-1975, Vol III, Sounds View Press, Madison CT, 1999,  p. 3724.
 Forbes, David W., "Encounters with Paradise: Views of Hawaii and its People, 1778-1941", Honolulu Academy of Arts, 1992, 255.
 Hughes, Edan, Artists in California 1786-1940, Sacramento, Crocker Art Museum, 2002, p. 637.
 Morse, Morse (ed.), Honolulu Printmakers, Honolulu, HI, Honolulu Academy of Arts, 2003, p. 18, 
 Papanikolas, Theresa and DeSoto Brown, Art Deco Hawai'i, Honolulu, Honolulu Museum of Art, 2014, pp. 72–73
 Sandulli, Justin M., Troubled Paradise: Madge Tennent at a Hawaiian Crossroads, Durham, NC: Duke University, 2016

Footnotes

American women painters
Painters from Hawaii
1909 births
2010 deaths
American centenarians
Punahou School alumni
University of Hawaiʻi at Mānoa alumni
University of Washington alumni
Alumni of the Slade School of Fine Art
People from Severna Park, Maryland
20th-century American women artists
Women centenarians
21st-century American women